DWST (101.7 FM), broadcasting as 101.7 Love Radio, is a radio station owned and operated by Manila Broadcasting Company. The station's studio and transmitter are located at the 4/F Landbank Bldg., Quezon Ave., San Fernando, La Union.

References

External Links
Love Radio La Union FB Page
Love Radio La Union Website

Radio stations in La Union
Radio stations established in 1988